Thanasis Sentementes is a Greek footballer currently signed to Kerkyra F.C.

References

1975 births
Living people
Greek footballers
Kalamata F.C. players
PAS Giannina F.C. players
Panserraikos F.C. players
A.O. Kerkyra players
Panachaiki F.C. players
Association football defenders
Doxa Vyronas F.C. players
Footballers from Kalamata